Electric car use by country varies worldwide, as the adoption of plug-in electric vehicles is affected by consumer demand, market prices, availability of charging infrastructure, and government policies, such as purchase incentives and long term regulatory signals (ZEV mandates,  emissions regulations, fuel economy standards, and phase-out of internal combustion engine vehicles).

Plug-in electric vehicles (PEVs) are generally divided into all-electric or battery electric vehicles (BEVs), that run only on batteries, and plug-in hybrids (PHEVs), that combine battery power with internal combustion engines. The popularity of electric vehicles has been expanding rapidly due to government subsidies, their increased range and lower battery costs, and environmental sensitivity. However, the stock of plug-in electric cars represented just 1% of all passengers vehicles on the world's roads by the end of 2020, of which pure electrics constituted two-thirds.

Global cumulative sales of highway-legal light-duty plug-in electric vehicles reached 1 million units in September 2015, 5 million in December 2018, and passed the 10 million milestone in 2020. By mid-2022, there were over 20 million light-duty plug-in vehicles on the world's roads. Sales of plug-in passenger cars achieved a 9% global market share of new car sales in 2021, up from 4.6% in 2020, and 2.5% in 2019.
The PEV market has been shifting towards fully electric battery vehicles. The global ratio between BEVs and PHEVs went from 56:44 in 2012, to 60:40 in 2015, and rose to 74:26 in 2019. The ratio was to 71:29 in 2021.

, China had the largest stock of highway legal plug-in passenger cars with 10 million units, 46% of the global fleet in use. China also dominates the plug-in light commercial vehicle and electric bus deployment, with its stock reaching over 500,000 buses in 2019, 98% of the global stock, and 247,500 electric light commercial vehicles, 65% of the global fleet.

Europe had about 5.5 million plug-in passenger cars at the end of 2021, accounting for over 32% of the global stock. Europe also has the world's second largest electric light commercial vehicle stock, with about 220,000 vans. , cumulative sales in the United States totaled 2.32 million plug-in cars, with California listed as the largest U.S. plug-in regional market with 1 million plug-in cars sold by November 2021.

, Germany is the leading European country with 1.38 million plug-in cars registered since 2010.
Norway has the highest market penetration per capita in the world, and also has the world's largest plug-in segment market share of new car sales, 86.2% in 2021. Over 10% of all passenger cars on Norwegian roads were plug-ins in October 2018, and rose to 22% in 2021.
The Netherlands has the highest density of EV charging stations in the world by 2019.

History 

The global stock of plug-in electric vehicles (PEVs) between 2005 and 2009 consisted exclusively of all-electric cars (BEV), totaling about 1,700 units in 2005, and almost 6,000 in 2009. The plug-in stock rose to about 12,500 units in 2010, of which 350 were plug-in hybrids (PHEVs). By comparison, during the Golden Age of the electric car at the beginning of the 20th century, the EV stock peaked at approximately 30,000 vehicles. After the introduction of the Think City, Nissan Leaf and the Chevrolet Volt in late December 2010, the first mass-production plug-in electric cars by major manufacturers, plug-in sales grew to about 50,000 units in 2011, to 125,000 in 2012, and almost 213,000 cars and utility vans in 2013. Sales totaled over 315,000 units in 2014, up 48% from 2013. In March 2014, Norway became the first country where over 1 in every 100 passenger cars on the roads was a plug-in, and, by October 2018, 1 in every 10 passenger cars registered in Norway was a plug-in.

In five years, global sales of highway legal light-duty plug-in vehicles increased more than ten-fold, totaling more than 565,000 units in 2015—an 80% increase from 2014, driven mainly by China and Europe. About 775,000 plug-in electric cars and vans were sold in 2016, and 1.22 million in 2017—up 57% from 2016—with China accounting for about half of global sales. The global market share of the new light-duty plug-in segment reached 1.3% in 2017, up from 0.86% in 2016, and 0.38% in 2014. Global light-duty plug-in vehicle sales passed the 3 million milestone in November 2017 and 5 million at the end 2018. Global sales totaled 2,018,247 plug-in passenger cars in 2018, up 72% from 2017, with a market share of 2.1%. The BEV:PHEV ratio rose to 69:31 in 2018 and to 74:26 in 2019. By the end of 2019 the stock of light-duty plug-in vehicles totaled about 7.5 million units. Worldwide sales in 2019 rose to 2,209,831 units with a global market share of 2.5%. The combined number of PEV and hybrid cars sold in the European Union hit a record in July 2020, accounting for 18% of the total number of passenger cars sold. It also was the first time that more than 200,000 electric cars were sold in a single month.

Statistics

Sales, market, and usage share

Sales

Market share

Albania 
Albania is considered one of the best countries for emissions for electric cars as it generates all of its electricity from hydroelectric power. Electric cars are currently used by the Albanian Police Force. The Interior Minister claimed, that the cost of fuel per  would be less than 120 Albanian leke (less than 1 euro). Saytaxi is the first taxi company in Albania that offers electric vehicles and operates a fast EV (electric vehicles) charging point, and have been operating in the country since 2014. Its goal is to replace 80% of all non-electric cars with electric in the taxi business.

On 31 October 2017, Tirana became one of the few European capital cities to use electric buses when they tested a Solaris Urbino 12, with the purpose of reducing pollution. Tirana's goal is to gradually convert 10 to 20 percent of the bus fleet into electric ones.

Australia

The total stock of electric vehicles in Australia is approximately 21,000 as of 2020. In May 2021, electric vehicles accounted for 2% of new car sales in Australia, with approximately 5,000 Tesla vehicles sold in the first half of 2021. However, it has been predicted that approximately 66% of Australians will be driving electric cars by 2030. Moreover, 56% of Australians would consider an electric car when they next bought a vehicle. In early 2020, electric vehicle registrations nearly doubled the registrations of the previous year, showing the rapidly increasing popularity of electric vehicles in Australia. 
The Tesla Model 3 is Australia's most popular electric vehicle accounting for 70% of EV sales in 2019.

The Labor-led opposition government in Australia in 2019 proposed a 50% electric vehicle target by 2030. Government analysis in 2019 also forecasted 50% of all new cars sold in Australia by 2035 will be electric on the current path.

The state of Victoria is Australia's most important electric vehicle market with the highest number of electric vehicle purchases in Australia between 2011 and 2017 with a total of 1,324 car sales. 
Victoria also manufactures electric vehicles with a commercial electric vehicle manufacturing facility to be established in 2021, producing 2,400 vehicles per year.

In March 2021, the Hyundai Nexo became the first fuel cell electric vehicle (FCEV) to be released in Australia. Coinciding with the release of the Nexo, the first publicly available hydrogen refuelling station in Australia opened the same day in Canberra.

Government incentives 
Despite no federal EV sales target, Victoria aim for 50% of new car sales to be electric vehicles by 2030. The South Australian government also aim for 100% of new car sales to be electric vehicles by 2035. 
The NSW Government is also considering an official ban date for the sale of petrol and diesel vehicles.

Nationally, fuel efficient vehicles attract less Luxury Car Tax, leading to a saving of up to $2,648. 
Victoria offers a subsidy of $3,000 – $5,000 for BEV cars under $68,740. 
ACT offers $15,000 interest free loan Victorian EV drivers pay a reduced rate of stamp duty and $100 off registration fees In ACT BEVs stamp duty exempt and 20% reduction in registration fees with the first 2 years of registration free EVs exempt from stamp duty until 2023 In Tasmania Car rental companies are exempt from registration fees on new and used EVs

The Federal Government pledged to spend $74.5 million on charging infrastructure in the budget in 2021. The Federal Government is also contributing $15 million to a national electric vehicle charging network built by Evie Networks and connecting Melbourne, Canberra, Sydney, Adelaide and Brisbane.

Austria 

Sales of new battery electric vehicles (BEV) rose from 1677 in 2015 to 6764 in 2018. At the first half of 2019, 4913 new BEV were sold, representing 2.8% of the overall sales.

Belgium 

Sales of electric cars rose from 97 units in 2009, to 116 in 2010, 425 in 2011, to 900 in 2012. Of the latter, only 350 units were sold to individuals. Then, sales of new battery electric vehicles (BEV) rose from 1358 in 2015 to 3647 in 2018. At the first half of 2019, 4601 new BEV were sold, representing 1.5% of the overall sales.

The Belgian government established purchase incentives for BEVs, ending in 2012. Hybrids were not eligible. A separate subsidy supported investments in public charging stations.

Brazil

, 2,214 hybrid and electric vehicles were registered in the state of São Paulo In March 2013, the first two Leafs were deployed in Rio de Janeiro to operate as taxis. In September 2014 the BMW i3 became the first EV available for retail customers. , other retail plug-ins were the BMW i8 and the Mitsubishi Outlander P-HEV.

Plug-ins and hybrids are subject to taxes adding up to more than 120% of the retail price.

In May 2014 São Paulo City passed a municipal law to exempt EV, hybrids and fuel cell vehicles from the city's driving restriction scheme (see also road space rationing#São Paulo) and purchase incentives.

In April 2018, the city of São José dos Campos ordered 30 electric BYD vehicles for use by the police and government.

In March 2019, Renault released the Zoe in Brazil, and, in April 2019, Jac released the E40 as the cheapest electric car in Brazil, at R$129.990, Nissan announced the Leaf to be released in Brazil in the first half of 2019

Bulgaria
There were 560 electric motorbikes and 520 electric cars officially registered in Bulgaria by the end of March 2018. By early 2020 the total number of electric cars in Bulgaria is estimated to be at least 1100. Sales of new battery electric vehicles (BEV) rose from 21 in 2015 to 194 in 2018, with only 6 in 2016. At the first half of 2019, 141 new BEV were sold, representing 0.7% of the overall sales.

The government does not provide grants for buying electric cars, but at least it does not apply road tax to them. Parking electric vehicles in central urban parking zones is free of charge as well.

In 2012, 'green taxi' hybrid cabs went into service in Sofia. In 2017, test electric buses joined the public transport fleet of Sofia and in 2018 and 2019, 35 new electric buses went into service. It is estimated that by 2021, 20% of the bus fleet of Sofia will be electric. Other cities and towns such as Plovdiv, Pernik and Haskovo are also ordering electric buses.

The first car sharing company in Bulgaria Spark.bg uses only electric cars and as of August 2020 it has a fleet of around 500 electric vehicles and over 200 available charging stations in Sofia. Courier company Speedy uses 20 electric Renault Kangoo.

Canada

The stock of plug-in electric passenger cars in Canada in use totaled 141,100 units at the end of 2019, consisting of 78,680 all-electric cars and 62,380 plug-in hybrids.

Purchase and other incentives for new EVs are offered by the provinces of Quebec and British Columbia.

In October 2016, Quebec passed legislation that obliges major carmakers to offer an increasing number of PHEV and BEV models, beginning with 3.5% in 2018 and rising to 15.5% in 2020, using a tradable credit system.

China

, China had the world's largest stock of highway legal plug-in passenger cars with 7.84 million units, corresponding to about 46% of the global plug-in car fleet in use. Of these, all-electric cars accounted for 81.6% of the all new energy passenger cars in circulation. The plug-in car segment achieved a record 15% market share in 2021. Plug-in passenger cars represent 2.6% of all cars on Chinese roads at the end of 2021.

Domestically produced cars dominate new energy car sales in China, accounting for about 96% of sales in 2017. Another particular feature of the Chinese passenger plug-in market is the dominance of small entry level vehicles.

, China also dominated the plug-in light commercial vehicle and electric bus deployment, with its stock reaching over 500,000 buses in 2019, 98% of the global stock, and 247,500 electric light commercial vehicles, 65% of the global fleet. In addition, the country also leads sales of medium- and heavy duty electric trucks, with over 12,000 trucks sold, and nearly all battery electric. Since 2011, cumulative sales of all classes of new energy vehicles (NEV) totaled 7.4 million at the end of September 2021.

Chile

The Mitsubishi i-MiEV was the first EV in Chile. The first public quick charging station was opened in April 2011.

In August 2014 Mitsubishi replaced the i-Miev with the Outlander PHEV. Later that year BMW introduced their "i" range with the i3; Renault launched their Zero Emission (Z.E.) lineup, including the Fluence Z.E. sedan, the Kangoo utility van and Zoe city car. The French brand sold 22 electric vehicles in their first month in the Chilean market.

Colombia

Latin America's first battery electric taxi fleet of 45 vehicles was launched at the beginning of 2013 in Bogotá, the largest electric taxi fleet in South America at the time. These taxis were exempted from the Pico y placa driving restriction scheme. The program is an effort to improve air quality and set an example.

The BMW i3 was introduced in Colombia in 2014. The BEV Renault Twizy quadricycle was introduced in the Colombian market in June 2015 and, 203 Twizys had been sold. Sales of the Outlander P-HEV were scheduled to begin in September 2015. Sales of other electric vehicles totaled, 35 Mitsubishi i-MiEVs (purchased by an electricity company), 25 BMW i3s, 19 Renault Kangoos (corporate purchases), and 4 Nissan Leafs (corporate purchases).

In 2013 the government established incentives to promote EV adoption. These include the exemption from the driving restriction scheme in place in Colombian cities such as Bogotá and Medellín. The government exempted BEV and PHEV cars from import duties for three years, with an annual quota of 750 cars of each type.

Costa Rica

, Costa Rica had a stock of 2,529 light-duty all-electric vehicles. In addition, the country had a stock of 858 all-electric motorcycles. The fleet of fully electric cars grew from 86 units in 2010 to 200 in 2017. After the approval of the 2018 law that granted import duty and value added tax exemptions, the fleet grew from 398 units in 2018, to 1,484 in 2020, and for the first time, more than 1,000 units were sold in 2021. Plug-in hybrids and conventional hybrid electric vehicles do not have government financial incentives, therefore they are not included in this statistical data.

The first electric car to go on sale in the country was the REVAi, introduced in March 2009. The REVAi, powered by lead–acid batteries, sold 10 units. The Mitsubishi i MiEV was launched in February 2011, with initial availability limited to 25 to 50 units. According to Mitsubishi, Costa Rica was selected at the first market launch in the Americas due to its environmental record, despite the lack of government incentives for purchasing electric cars.
The top selling model in 2016 was the Mitsubishi Outlander P-HEV with 60 units.

Other all-electric and plug-in hybrid cars introduced early in Costa Rica include the BYD Qin (November 2013), Mitsubishi Outlander (March 2015) and BMW i3 (September 2016).

Government incentives

In 2006 electric cars were exempted from the consumption tax, while conventional vehicles faced a 30% rate. 
In October 2012, electric cars were exempted from San José's driving restrictions. EVs were exempted from import duties and the government agreed to deploy charging stations in strategic locations in San José.

In January 2018 went into effect the "Law for the Promotion of Electric Transportation", which promotes the adoption of electric vehicles through the implementation of incentives and tax exemptions when purchasing an all-electric car. Electric vehicles are also exempt from the annual circulation fee, which phases out by 20% each year during a five-year period.

Croatia
, 2067 electric cars had been sold in Croatia. Of these, 224 were EVs, while the rest were hybrids. , 201 free public charging stations operated in Croatia.

In 2014 and 2015, the Croatian government initiated purchase incentives. The subsidies were discontinued in 2016, due to ineffectiveness.

Czech Republic 

Sales of new battery electric vehicles (BEV) rose from 298 in 2015 to 703 in 2018. At the first half of 2019, 360 new BEV were sold, representing 0.3% of the overall sales.

Denmark 

In the late 1980s to early 1990s, a few thousand of the small, one-person and locally produced Ellert were sold in Denmark, but relatively few remain today. In the following decade, very few electric cars were sold in Denmark, but a clear increase began around 2010. In 2015, Denmark was the second largest European market for light-duty, plug-in commercial vehicles or utility vans, with over 2,600 plug-in vans sold that year, representing 8.5% of all vans sold. Most vans were plug-in hybrids, accounting for almost all EU plug-in van sales.

Up to and including 2015, electric cars had been exempt from vehicle registration tax, but it was decided that this would be gradually outphased: In 2016, the vehicle registration tax for electric cars was placed at 20% of the normal rate, in 2017 it was planned to increase to 40% and within five years it would become the full rate. This had a large effect on the sale, which drastically fell in 2016–17. As a consequence, it was decided that the increase in vehicle registration tax for electric vehicles would be delayed, being capped at 20% of the normal rate in 2017–19, then gradually increasing until 2023 where it would become the full rate. A new fund for fuel cell vehicles was also started.

In 2020, a new taxation deal was reached, valid for all cars from 2021 to 2030. Its rates depend heavily on the -emission of the car. This means that vehicle registration tax for all-electric cars (BEVs) that cost less than 510,000 DKK (€68,500) will remain very low with a slower than initially planned gradual increase to normal levels, most plug-in hybrids (PHEVs) will increase from 2021 but remain lower than gasoline and diesel cars, and diesel cars will increase. The goal of this plan is to have at least 775,000 electric cars (BEV or PHEV) by 2030. Combined with other plans, it is the goal to have at least 1 million zero-emission or low-emission cars by 2030 and that no new gasoline or diesel cars will be sold in the country from that year.

, there were a total of 2,781,855 registered cars in Denmark, of which more than 5%, or 144,498, are electric (BEV or PHEV).

Estonia 

, 1,188 plug-in vehicles were registered.

, the nationwide network consisted of 165 fast chargers.

In 2011, the government confirmed the sale to Mitsubishi of 10 million carbon dioxide credits in exchange for 507 i-MiEV electric cars. The deal included funding 250 fast charging stations and subsidies for the first 500 private buyers of any electric approved by the EU. The first 50 i-MiEVs were delivered in October 2011, for use by municipal social workers.

Sales of new battery electric vehicles (BEV) rose from 34 in 2015 to 85 in 2018, after a stagnation in 2016 and 2017. At the first half of 2019, 42 new BEV were sold, representing 0.2% of the overall sales.

Estonia's figures are low compared to other advanced economies, attributed to lack of government incentives after the carbon credit scheme was exhausted.

Ecuador
The offer and demand for electric vehicles in the South American nation is reduced. Electric charging stations are present in several shopping malls and public parking in Guayaquil, Quito, Cuenca, Ambato and Loja.

In Ecuador, all electric vehicles are exempt from customs duties and taxes starting in June 2019. The electric vehicle offer in the country is set to increase. The Ecuadorean government has been incentivizing the us of electric vehicles with tax cuts. However, both the offer and demand remained short, encouraging the government to eliminate all duties to electric vehicles.

The first commercially available EV was Kia Soul EV 2016. Being at the moment the brand with the most presence of EV in Ecuador. As of 2021 KIA, BYD and Nissan are among the EV brands offering vehicles for the Ecuadorian market.

Europe overview 

Europe had about 5.6 million plug-in electric passenger cars and light commercial vehicles in circulation at the end of 2021. , Europe accounted for 25% of the global stock, the second largest after China. Europe also had the world's second largest electric light commercial vehicle stock after China, with about 220,000 vans.

The 27 Member States of the European Union had 2.24 million plug-in vehicles on the road in 2020, of which plug-in passenger cars represented 94.3%, followed by light commercial vehicles (5.4%), and buses and trucks accounted for 0.3% and 0.03% respectively.
In 2020, and despite the strong decline in global car sales brought by the COVID-19 pandemic, annual sales of plug-in passenger cars in Europe surpassed the 1 million mark for the first time. In addition, Europe outsold China in 2020 as the world's largest plug-in passenger car market for the first time since 2015. In spite of the continued global decline in car sales in 2021 due to the shortages related to the COVID-19 pandemic, and the global computer chip shortage, plug-in car sales rose to 2.27 million, up 66% from 2020.

The plug-in car segment had a market share of 1.3% of new car registrations in 2016, rose to 3.6% in 2019, climbed to 11.4% in 2020, and achieved 19% in 2021. , Germany has the largest stock of plug-ins in Europe, with cumulative sales of 1.38 million plug-in cars registered since 2010, followed by France (786,274), the UK (~745,000), Norway (647,000), and the Netherlands (360,000). Germany listed as the top selling European country market since 2019.

Finland

, about 2,250 EVs were registered. 
Sales of new battery electric vehicles (BEV) rose from 243 in 2015 to 776 in 2018. At the first half of 2019, 995 new BEV were sold, representing 1.7% of the overall sales.

In November 2016, the government set the goal of 250,000 plug-in cars and 50,000 biogas cars on the road by 2030. These goals are part of the Finnish government efforts to comply with the 2015 Paris Agreement.

Basic charging infrastructure is available all over Finland, used for winter engine pre-warming. Because of its climate – cold winters and warm summers – Finland is considered a convenient "test laboratory" for electric cars.

Many companies in Finland are involved in next-generation vehicle manufacturing, including Valmet Automotive, Fortum (concept cars and infrastructure), Vacon (electric motor technology production), Ensto (production of charging units), Elcat (electric vehicle production since the 1980s), Raceabout (specialist electric sport car with very few sales).

Research related to electric cars is in progress at the VTT Technical Research Centre of Finland and Tekes.

Electric car organizations in Finland include the Electric Vehicle Association of Finland and Electric Vehicles Finland. A non-commercial electric car conversion organization is called Electric Cars – Now! that converts Toyota Corollas into Li-ion battery-powered electric cars.

France

, a total of 786,274 light-duty plug-in electric vehicles have been registered in France since 2010, consisting of 512,178 all-electric passenger cars and commercial vans, and 274,096 plug-in hybrids. Of these, around 60,000 were fully electric light commercial vehicles.

A record of 315,978 light-duty plug-in vehicles were registered in 2021, up 62% from 2020, and the light-duty segment's market share rose to 15.1% in 2021. The plug-in electric passenger car segment achieved a market share of 18.3% in 2021.

Germany

The stock of plug-in electric vehicles in Germany is the largest in Europe, there were 1,184,416 plug-in cars in circulation on 1 January 2022, representing 2.5% of all passenger cars on German roads, up from 1.2% the previous year. , cumulative sales totaled 1.38 million plug-in passenger cars since 2010. Germany had a stock of 21,890 light-duty electric commercial vehicles in 2019, the second largest in Europe after France. , the country had 27,730 public charging stations.

Germany listed as the top selling plug-in car market in the European continent in 2019 and achieved a market share of 3.10%. Despite the global decline in car sales brought by the COVID-19 pandemic, the segment market share achieved a record 13.6% in 2020. with a record volume of 394,632 plug-in passenger cars registered in 2020, up 263% from 2019, Germany listed for a second year running as the best selling European plug-in market. Both years, the German market led both the fully electric and plug-in hybrid segments. The only country that outsold Germany in 2020 was China. Sales in 2021 surged to 681,410 rechargeable units, capturing a record market share of 26.0%.

Under its National Platform for Electric Mobility, Chancellor Angela Merkel in 2010 set the goal of putting one million electric vehicles on German roads by 2020. Initially, the government did not provide subsidies in favor of research. The Bundestag passed the Electric Mobility Act in March 2015 that authorized local government to grant non-monetary incentives. The measures privilege battery-powered cars, fuel cell vehicles and some PHEVs, by granting local governments the authority to offer additional incentives.

An incentive scheme was approved in April 2016 including purchase subsidies, charging stations and another federal government fleet purchases, with a target of 400,000 electric vehicles. Premium cars, such as the Tesla Model S and BMW i8, were not eligible. To meet the climate targets for the transport sector, in 2016 the government set the goal to have from 7 to 10 million plug-in electric cars on the road by 2030, and 1 million charging points available in Germany also by 2030.

As a result of the economic impact of the COVID-19 pandemic, the government approved in June 2020 an economic recovery plan which included  to promote electric vehicle adoption and deployment of charging infrastructure. Also, other tax incentives for electric vehicles were introduced since 2020. Later, the government decided to keep the  bonus for the purchase of new all-electric cars and plug-in hybrids until the end of 2025. The original one million goal was achieved in July 2021.

Greece 

Sales of new battery electric vehicles (BEV) rose from 35 in 2015 to 190 in 2019. At the first three-quarters of 2020, 292 new BEVs and 590 new PHEVs were sold.

In June 2020, Greek Prime Minister Kyriakos Mitsotakis announced the government's plan to support the adoption of new battery electric vehicles (BEV) and plug-in hybrid electric vehicles (PHEV) by individuals and corporations, with the aim for one-in-three new vehicles in Greece to be electric by 2030. The plan includes purchase subsidizing, exemption from the road tax and any parking fees, as well as incentives for setting up charging stations, for pure electric private passenger cars and motorbikes, as well as for pure electric or plug-in hybrid taxis and light commercial vehicles. The government's subsidy covers the purchase of new BEVs and PHEVs with a total of 100 million euros for 18 months in the first phase, which is estimated to cover 25% of the cost of about 14.000 new electric vehicles.

The government will subsidize the purchase of each new electric vehicle, covering 15% of its cost (up to €5.500) for private passenger and light commercial vehicles, 20% of the cost (up to €800) for motorbikes and 25% of the cost (up to €8.000) for taxis. Vehicle owners that will concurrently retire their old vehicle will receive an additional bonus of up to €2.500. Furthermore, expenses for charging the electric car will be exempt from taxable income. The benefit for each new electric car, if combined with the ecological bonus and the relevant tax exemptions, will approach 10.000 euros.

Hong Kong

As of December 2017, 10,666 plug in vehicles were registered in Hong Kong. March 2017 saw 2,964 EVs registered in one month before first registration tax exemption was repealed. 2,939 of these cars were Tesla Model S and X. 

, 6,298 plug-in vehicles were on the roads in Hong Kong, up from 3,253 in October 2015. The plug-in segment market share achieved 4.8% of new car sales in Hong Kong in 2015.

, more than 1,200 public electric vehicle charging points were available. More than a dozen models were available for retail customers.

Sales of electric cars took off in Hong Kong with the Tesla Model S in 2014. The tax waiver made the Model S competitive in the luxury car segment, at about half the price of other high-end models. According to Tesla, Hong Kong had the world's highest density of Tesla superchargers, giving most Model S owners a supercharger within a 20-minute drive.

The Government offered purchase incentives to consumers, businesses and service providers were available from 2011 to 2017. The Government further allocated  million for bus companies to purchase 36 electric buses.

Hungary
In November 2018, 8,482 PEVs were registered in Hungary.
The Hungarian government introduced its e-mobility plan in March 2014. The Jedlik plan supported the domestic production of electric vehicles, expanding the necessary infrastructure and promoting the purchase of EVs with public incentives, including 1.5 million HUF, initiated at the end of 2016.

Sales of new passenger cars categorized as battery electric vehicles (BEV) rose from 115 in 2015 to 4837 in 2020.

Iceland

The plug-in car segment in Iceland reached 5.37% of all new vehicles registered in 2016, allowing the country to rank second in Europe after Norway that year. Registrations of new plug-in electric cars totaled 2,990 units in 2017, up 157% from the previous year. The segment's market share achieved a record 14%, globally, second only to Norway. The top selling plug-ins in 2017 were the Mitsubishi Outlander PHEV with 884 units and the Nissan Leaf with 524. In 2018, 284 new BEV units were sold and 423 in the first half of 2019, representing 5.8% of the overall new cars sales.

The government eliminated VAT (24%) and -based fees (up to 65%) on new car purchases for EVs.

, Orka Náttúrunnar (ON) was working to complete a network of 50 kW CCS Combo/CHAdeMO stations along the Ring Road. Tesla opened its first supercharger in Reykjavík in December 2019, with 4 more planned around Iceland in 2020.

Tesla started delivery in Iceland on 28 February 2020 and was quickly the number 1 new electric car sold in Iceland.  passenger plug-in market share of total new car sales for the year 2020 has reached 55%.

India

, over 28000 plug-in cars were registered until Mar 2022 out of a total of 1 million registered electric vehicles (including 2 and 3 wheelers and commercial 4 wheelers).
The Indian government has Faster Adoption and Manufacturing of Hybrid and Electric vehicles (FAME) scheme which provides incentives for purchasing electric vehicles.  Indian government has reduced GST rate on EVs from 12% to 5% in the Union Budget 2019 to encourage electric vehicles. The Indian government gives an additional tax benefit of Rs 150,000 on the interest paid on loans taken to buy EVs. The EVs in India are exempted from paying road tax for vehicle registration.

The number of electric vehicles in India is 13,34,385 (excluding data of Andhra Pradesh, Madhya Pradesh, Telangana and Lakshadweep, which is not available in VAHAN 4) as on 14 July 2022 and a total of 2,826 public charging stations are operational in the country, as per the Bureau of Energy Efficiency.

Indonesia

The government supported some trial models made by Tucuxi. Conversion of some vehicles to electric drivetrains was introduced during the APEC Meeting in October 2013.
In 2019, Hyundai sold officially car,Hyundai Ioniq. In 2022,the local production for Hyundai Ioniq 5 is started. Also Wuling Motors sold the most affordable electric car in Indonesia, named Wuling Air EV.

Ireland

Sales of electric cars in Ireland increased more than four times in 2014 from a low base. Then, sales of new battery electric vehicles (BEV) rose from 466 in 2015 to 1233 in 2018. At the first half of 2019, 1954 new BEV were sold, representing 2.4% of the overall sales.

The government committed to making 10% of all vehicles by 2020 (a projected 230,000 vehicles). 
Government officials reached agreements with French car maker Renault and its partner Nissan. , purchase incentives became available.

As of the start of 2020, Electric Vehicles (EVs) was as a proportion of all cars for sale in Ireland very small, which could be seen in a snapshot (7 February 2020) of four different car sales websites (Autotrader.ie, Carsireland.ie, Carzone.ie, and Donedeal.ie) which showed that out of circa 38,000 to 70,000 cars listed for sale, only circa 0.7% to 1.1% were EV's, so in real terms only 431–616 EV cars were advertised for sale in the market.
	
This very low level of EVs compared poorly to the circa 25,338 to 46,940 diesel cars shown available for sale on the same date, representing a much larger, circa 64–67% of the market at that time.

The Irish Government (to January 2020) had stated an aim to ban the sale of petrol, diesel and hybrid new ('non-electric') cars from 2030 (compared to the proposed EU ban by 2040, and the UK's proposed ban on the sale of new petrol, diesel and hybrid cars from 2035 as announced in the first week of February 2020) though car dealers were reported in 2020 to consider the Irish Government's target for one million electric and plug-in hybrid cars to be in use by 2030, as far too ambitious, though Government grants of up to €10,000 also available (as of 2020)(The Irish Times, 7 February 2020). It was also reported (The Irish Times, 7 February 2020) in the Irish newspapers in February 2020 that there were at that time about 1,200 electric car (EV) charging points in Ireland, but that this was compared to Norway, the European leader in EV transition, with approximately 12,000 charging stations for circa 300,000 EVs and plug-in hybrid electric vehicles (PHEV).

A compromise in terms of transition and non-electric ban implementation around 2030 maybe for acceptance also of Hybrid cars with smaller conventional petrol engines (regardless of whether the vehicles are 'full' or 'mild' hybrids) of for example at/ less than 1.6-liter (1600 cc) capacity, and/ or say less circa 100 g/km  or less in terms of emissions, or a good fuel efficiency rating (L/100 km ) for highway/extra urban and 'combined' journeys.

Israel

Italy 

, almost 100,000 plug-in passenger cars were registered in Italy, consisting of 55,307 BEV cars and 44,231 PHEVs. In addition, there were 6,315 light-duty commercial vehicles. At the end of 2020, plug-in passenger cars represented just 0.3% of all cars on Italian roads.

The top EV in 2015 was the Nissan Leaf (390 units sold).
About 10,000 electric vehicles were sold in Italy in 2018, double the 2017 number of about 5,000.

Sales of new battery electric vehicles (BEV) rose from 1442 in 2015 to 4996 in 2018. At the first half of 2019, 5040 new BEV were sold, representing 0.5% of the overall sales.
The government discontinued incentives in 2014 amid a limited public charging infrastructure and tepid reception. Further, many Italian houses were equipped with electric contracts allowing only 3 kW of peak consumption, making home charging of electric cars impractical.

Japan

, Japan had a stock of plug-in passenger cars of 293,081 units on the road, consisting of 156,381 all-electric cars and 136,700 plug-in hybrids. The fleet of electric light commercial vehicles in use totaled 9,904 units in 2020.

Sales totaled 24,690 units in 2016, rose to 54,100 in 2017, and then declined to 49,750 in 2018, and fell to 38,900 in 2019. The segment market share declined from 0.68% in 2014 to 0.59% in 2016, and recovered to 1.1% in 2017. The decline in plug-in sales reflects the governmental and domestic carmaker decision to promote hydrogen fuel cell vehicles instead. The market share further fell to 0.7% in 2019 and 0.6% in 2020.

In May 2009 the Japanese Diet passed the "Green Vehicle Purchasing Promotion Measure". The program provided purchasing subsidies for cars, mini and keis, trucks and buses, including an extra subsidy for purchases trading in a sufficiently old used car. 
The program ended on 31 March 2010. The Japanese electric vehicle charging infrastructure climbed from 60 public stations in 2010 to 1,381 in 2012.

Mitsubishi introduced multiple plug-in vehicles: the Mitsubishi i MiEV in 2009, the Mitsubishi Minicab MiEV in 2011, a truck version of the Minicab MiEV and the Mitsubishi Outlander P-HEV in 2013. The Nissan Leaf launched in 2010. The Toyota Prius PHEV was released in January 2012.

The Leaf is Japan's all-time bestselling plug-in car, with about 140,000 units delivered by February 2020. Prius PHEV sales since inception totaled about 61,200 units up to December 2018. , the Outlander PHEV had sold 42,451 units. Sales of the Outlander PHEV fell sharply from April 2016 as a result of Mitsubishi's fuel economy scandal.

Kosovo 
There have not been much effort in by Kosovo of using Plug-in electric vehicles. However ProCredit Bank, Kosova, became the first institution in Kosovo to use electric vehicles, by buying 10 new Mitsubishi i-MiEV vehicles. In 2017, six teens in the city Gjakova, from BONEVET makerspace, became the first European teenager group to build an electric car out of a Renault Twingo, transforming it from a petrol-fueled car to a fully functional electric car.

Latvia 
Sales of new battery electric vehicles (BEV) rose from 17 in 2015 to 73 in 2018. At the first quarter of 2019, 46 new BEV were sold, representing 0.4% of the overall sales.

Lithuania 
As of 1 July 2018, 806 EVs were registered. Registrations were led by Nissan (50%). Also 11,198 hybrids registered in Lithuania by 1 July 2018. Registrations were led by Toyota (64%).

Sales of new battery electric vehicles (BEV) rose from 37 in 2015 to 143 in 2018. At the first half of 2019, 75 new BEV were sold, representing 0.3% of the overall sales.

Luxembourg

Malaysia

Mexico

In October 2009 Nissan reached an agreement with the Mexico City government, purchasing 500 Leafs for use of government and corporate fleets. In exchange, recharging infrastructure was to be deployed by the city government. The first 100 Leafs (destined for the taxi fleet) were delivered in 2011.

, about 70 Leafs were deployed as taxis, 50 in Aguascalientes and 20 in Mexico City.

Retail Leaf sales began in June 2014. Retail deliveries of the BMW i3 began 2014.

The second generation Volt and Tesla Model S began in 2015.

, no government purchase incentives were available. However, electric cars are exempted from Mexico City's driving restriction scheme Hoy No Circula.

Nepal 
There are 45,000 electric vehicles running in Nepal as of 2019. Nepal is one of the best countries to buy an EV. Electric cars are actually a better deal in Nepal due to following reasons:

 Extremely low import tax compared to fossil fuel vehicle. (238% for fuel and 10% for electric)
 Hydropower makes it clean energy. (91% of the electricity comes from hydro in Nepal)
 No fossil fuel production. (Nepal imports fossil fuels and the prices are usually high)

Netherlands

, there were 390,454 highway-legal light-duty plug-in electric vehicles in use in the Netherlands, consisting of 137,663 fully electric cars, 243,664 plug-in hybrid cars, and 9,127 light duty plug-in commercial vehicles. The fleet in circulation of plug-in electric passenger cars represented 4.3% of all passenger cars in Dutch roads at the end of 2021, up from 3.1% in 2020.
 
The plug-in market share declined from 9.9% in 2015, to 6.7% in 2016, and fell to 2.6% in 2017. After several adjustments in the financial incentives and tax code to favor the purchase of all-electric vehicles, the market share rose to 14.9% in 2019, 24.6% in 2020, and achieved 29.8% in 2021, now with dominance of battery electric vehicle sales since 2019.

From 1 January 2016, all-electric vehicles continue to pay a 4% registration fee, but for a plug-in hybrids the fee rises from 7% to 15% if its  emissions do not exceed 50 g/km. The rate for a conventional internal combustion car is 25% of its book value.

The Dutch government set a target of 15,000 electric vehicles in 2015, 200,000 in 2020 and 1 million in 2025. 
The government exempted selected vehicles from registration fee and road taxes. 
The exemption from the registration tax ended in 2013. Battery electric vehicles have special access to parking spaces in Amsterdam, queues for which can otherwise reach up to 10 years. 
Free charging is offered in public parking spaces.

Other factors contributing to the rapid adoption of plug-in electric vehicles are the Netherlands' small size, which reduces range anxiety; a long tradition of environmental activism; high gasoline prices ( per gallon as of January 2013); and some EV leasing programs that provide free or discounted gasoline-powered vehicles for covering long distances.

New Zealand

, about 35,300 light-duty plug-in electric vehicles were registered in New Zealand. The majority of the fleet consists of used imports from Japan and the most popular used model is the Nissan Leaf with 13,900 registered. The country's most popular new EV is the Tesla Model 3 with 3,800 registrations.

The target set in 2016 for New Zealand to have 64,000 electric vehicles in the country by the end of 2021 was not achieved, although by 2020 there were more EVs in New Zealand than Australia, despite Australia having five times the population of New Zealand. The government agency EECA have forecasted 60,000 – 136,000 EVs in the NZ fleet by 2023 and other projections suggest New Zealand will reach 100% electric vehicle sales by 2030.

The New Zealand Government launched an Electric Vehicle Programme in May 2016 to encourage EV uptake and added a Clean Car Discount in June 2021. Electric vehicles in New Zealand are exempt from road user charges until at least 31 March 2024, and attract the Clean Car Discount when first registered in the country. In 2022, New Zealand enacted strict  target legislation on vehicle importers for the period 2023–2027, and imposed charges on the purchase of high  emission cars, which will accelerate electric vehicle adoption.

Norway

, the stock of light-duty plug-in electric vehicles in Norway totaled 647,000 units in use, consisting of 470,309 all-electric passenger cars and vans (including used imports), and 176,691 plug-in hybrids.

Norway's fleet of electric cars is one of the world's cleanest, because 99% of its power comes from hydropower (see also renewable energy in Norway). 
Norway has the world's largest EV ownership per capita.

The plug-in electric passenger car segment captured a market share of 29.1% in 2016, 39.2% in 2017, 49.1% in 2018, rose to 55.9% in 2019, 74.7% in 2020, and achieved 86.2% in 2021. In January 2017 the electric-drive segment surpassed combined conventional internal combustion engine sales for the first time ever, achieving a combined market share of 51.4% of new car sales. In October 2018, Norway became the first country where 1 in every 10 passenger cars registered was a plug-in electric vehicle. , plug-in electric cars represented 25% of all passenger cars in circulation in Norway.

The following table shows sales of new battery electric vehicles (BEV) and the segment market share:

*Note: these figures are for registrations of new zero-emission passenger cars (ZEVs) so it includes a few FCVs

Norway was the first country in the world to have all-electric cars ranking as the best selling passenger car model of the year, and for two consecutive years. First, the Nissan Leaf, with 12,303 units registered in 2018, ended as the country's best selling new passenger car model, marking the first time an electric car tops annual sales of the passenger car segment. Thereafter, the Tesla Model 3 topped annual passenger car sales in 2019 with 15,683 units registered. Also, in March 2019, the Model 3, with over 5,300 units delivered, set the all-time record for monthly sales of a single passenger car model. Another record was set in 2018 and repeated in 2019, as the top 5 best selling passenger car models in both years were all plug-in electric models.

Government incentives
The Norwegian government set a series of incentives to promote the adoption of zero emission vehicles (ZEVs). Electric vehicles are exempt from all non-recurring vehicle fees, making electric cars price competitive with conventional cars. BEVs have lower public parking fees and toll payments (including domestic ferries), as well as given access to bus lanes. Plug-in hybrids have a smaller market share than ZEVs because they are not eligible for the same incentives. In 2013 the government reduced taxes for to improve PHEV sales.

The initial 50,000 vehicle target was reached on 20 April 2015 at a cost of up to 4 billion krone (around ). The Government decided to continue the incentives through 2017, although the Parliament phased out some of the incentives. , 24 out of 58 major municipalities kept the free parking for EVs. Among the 34 municipalities that terminated the benefit, six kept different variants of partial free parking.

In 2016, the government proposed its National Transport Plan 2018–2029 (NTP) with the goal that all new cars, buses and light commercial vehicles in 2025 should be zero emission vehicles. By 2030, heavy-duty vans, 75% of new long-distance buses, and 50% of new trucks must be zero emission vehicles.

Pakistan 

Pakistan already has a significant market for hybrid vehicles with the Honda Vezel, Toyota Prius, Toyota Aqua, and other models seen on the roads. 
The Automotive Development Policy (2016–2021) and the launch of China-Pakistan Economic Corridor (CPEC) are encouraging foreign investments for the new automobile brands to enter Pakistani market, while the leading manufacturers in the automobile industry in Pakistan are now introducing EV models with a wide range of prices which target consumers of diverse income groups. 
Several members of the international automobile industry including South Korea, China, and Japan also believe that Pakistan has a

In January 2017, Dewan Motors with BMW inaugurated Pakistan's first public charging station for electric and plug-in hybrid electric vehicles in Emporium Mall, Lahore. Dewan Motors had installed another station for plug-in hybrid and electric vehicles at Dolmen Mall in Karachi in February 2017. 
Rahmat Group has acquired 25 acres of land to establish Electrical Complex at Nooriabad to produce electric vehicles. At the initial stage, the group will produce electric buses to tap the transport market, and in the second phase, a manufacturing plant would be established at the complex to produce electric cars and two-wheelers.

On 2017, Jolta International had created the first locally manufactured electric motorcycle. The company is based just outside of Bahria Town Rawalpindi, and showcased three Jolta Chargeable Electrical Motorcycles in Gwadar.

Leading automobile manufacturers, including Super Power Motorcycles, have started introducing EV models. Neon, a Pakistan-based motorcycle assembler, has introduced an all-electric Neon M3 motorbike in Pakistan. The sports bike comes with emission free and noiseless features. Neon also assembles Electric scooters in Pakistan.

Philippines 
The country's first electric was launched at Silliman University by Insular Technologies in August 2007. In some major cities such as Makati, electric Jeepneys (e-jeepneys) are used as well as electric tricycles (e-tricycles). The Philippine Public Utility Modernization Program (PUVMP) aims to employ around 100,000 e-tricycles annually and 200,000 e-jeepney in the next six years.

The Eagle G-Car is a Philippine BEV car (at a cost as low as $3,000-$6,000). E-Jeepneys were a venture of Renewable Independent Power Producer Inc., which sprang from Greenpeace and other groups, and Solarco, which in turn is a part of GRIPP.

During a demonstration at Nanyang Technological University on 7 February 2018, Nissan Philippines' president and managing director Ramesh Narasimhan has announced that they would like to bring the Leaf to the Filipino market.

Poland 

In 2009, Poland began developing charging station infrastructure in Gdańsk, Katowice, Kraków, Mielec and Warsaw with EU funds. In November 2017 an electric car sharing network opened in Wrocław. The fleet is based on 2013 model of Nissan Leaf.

The biggest organization in Poland in the area of electric vehicles is Klaster Green Stream.
The Polish company  (3xE – electric cars) offer electric vehicle conversions of small city cars such as the Smart ForTwo, Citroën C1, Fiat Panda, Peugeot 107, Audi A2.

Sales of new battery electric vehicles (BEV) rose from 70 in 2015 to 620 in 2018. At the first half of 2019, 947 new BEV were sold, representing 0.3% of the overall sales.

Portugal 
, there were 29,700 plug-in passenger cars in use in Portugal. Of these, 15,980 were fully electric cars and 13,720 were plug-in hybrids. The market share rose from 0.8% in 2016 to 3.7% in 2018, and achieved 5.7% in 2019.

In 2015, the stock of EVs was about 2,000, consisting of 1,280 BEV cars and 720 PHEVs. EV sales totaled 1,305 units in 2015, up 260% from 2014. The top selling model was the Mitsubishi Outlander P-HEV (229). Sales of new battery electric vehicles (BEV) rose from 645 in 2015 to 4073 in 2018. At the first half of 2019, 3905 new BEV were sold, representing 3.0% of the overall sales.

In 2009, Portugal worked with Renault and Nissan to create a national charging network.

In 2010, the government offered purchase incentives for the first 5,000 EVs and a separate scrappage incentive. EVs were exempted from the vehicle registration tax. These incentives were discontinued at the end of 2011.

Romania 

Sales of new battery electric vehicles (BEV) rose from 24 in 2015 to 605 in 2018. At the first half of 2019, 456 new BEV were sold, representing 0.6% of the overall sales.

, over 3,000 EVs were registered. Registrations were led by the Renault Zoe. The government offered purchase incentives of 4200 euro (20000 RON) for a PHEV and 8400 euro (40000 RON) for BEV, although yearly capped (but not reached) and limited in time due to a yearly approval.

Russia 

As of January 2020, 6.3 thousand EVs were registered. A lot of them (83%) are cheap Nissan Leaf models, which were being imported from Japan.

Russian infrastructure can't offer a decent EV experience, considering huge distances between cities and lack of chargers in smaller towns, though the local governments try to increase the usage of electrocars (e.g. by removing taxes)

Serbia 
, 148 EVs were registered. Serbia has a network of over 30 charging stations (including 5 that are solar powered & 2 Tesla Super Chargers) with more planned for construction. In 2020, Serbia introduced new purchase & tax incentives for EVs & Hybrids offering up to 5000 euros to help accelerate electrification. 
Serbia is also home to about 10% of global Lithium reserves, the mining & processing of which will be done in partnership with Rio Tinto who have committed $1.5 billion of investment in the country. The government is currently looking to use this resource to produce a major EV battery plant & Rio Tinto is helping locate a strategic partner for this venture.

Singapore 

, there were 1,274 electric cars in Singapore, out of a total car population of 636,483 units (0.2%). Adoption has been slowed due to high purchase prices, lack of public charging infrastructure and unclear national policies. , 74 public charging stations were operating.

Until 2020, the government offered purchase incentives, although the country's taxation scheme made EVs more expensive than a conventional car. Electric cars faced a carbon surcharge and a scrap rebate, along with the annual road tax. In February 2021, the government announced the Singapore Green Plan 2030, which set the goals of deploying 60,000 charging points by 2030, new monetary purchase incentives, and for all new car registrations to be cleaner-energy models by the same year.

, there were 129 electric cars registered, with the BMW i3 and i8 range being the highest selling brand. In February 2017, Singapore had the largest fleet of electric taxis in Southeast Asia, with 100 vehicles from BYD. By December 2018, there were 466 fully electric cars registered in Singapore, 0.08% of the total car stock, and 357 plug-in hybrids, 0.06%.

Slovakia 
Sales of new battery electric vehicles (BEV) rose from 52 in 2015 to 309 in 2018. At the first half of 2019, 95 new BEV were sold, representing 0.2% of the overall sales.

Slovenia 
Sales of new battery electric vehicles (BEV) rose from 288 in 2017 to 467 in 2018. At the first half of 2019, 264 new BEV were sold, representing 0.7% of the overall sales. In 2021 1689 electric cars have been sold, which represents 3.2% of the overall market share.

South Africa 
, about 290 plug-in cars were registered, all in 2015. The Nissan Leaf was introduced in October 2013.
, this number has increased to 375, 0.2% of all registered vehicles.

GridCars is a Pretoria-based company promoting Commuter Cars, based on the TREV from Australia. The concept is to build ultra-light EVs, lessening demand on battery requirements, and making the vehicle more affordable.

The country has a 45% tax on electric vehicles which discourages their import. New internal combustion engine vehicles face a surcharge based on engine capacity.

South Korea

, South Korea had 92,400 plug-in passenger cars in circulation, of which, 84,070 were fully electric cars (91%). At the end of 2019, the country had 9,187 public slow and fast chargers.

, all electric models on sale were manufactured by local firms. The top selling models during 2015 were the Kia Soul EV (657) and the Samsung SM3 Z.E. (640). The Hyundai Ioniq Electric was released in July 2016.

The government offers a purchase subsidy for electric cars. Starting in 2016, the EV purchase tax surcharge was reduced, although EV drivers see various fees.

, about 7,200 plug-in cars had been sold. 2,896 EVs were sold during the first ten months of 2016, up 12% year-on-year.
By 2018 there were a total of 59,600 electric cars on Korean streets. Nearly 34,000 electric vehicles have been sold in 2018 in Korea. The market share of battery-electric and plugin-electric vehicles in Korea was 2.21%.

Spain

The stock of plug-in cars reached almost 6,000 plug-in as of 2015, consisting of 4,460 BEV cars and 1,490 PHEVs. The top selling model in 2015 was the Mitsubishi Outlander P-HEV (389).

3,129 EVs were sold in Spain during the first three-quarters of 2016. Sales continued to grow at an accelerated pace, up 79% from the same period in 2015.

Sales of new battery electric vehicles (BEV) rose from 1342 in 2015 to 5984 in 2018. At the first half of 2019, 5452 new BEV were sold, representing 0.8% of the overall sales. For the whole 2019, the sales came to 1.4% of all new registrations.

In 2011 the national government initiated EV purchase incentives. Aragón, Asturias, Baleares, Madrid, Navarra, Valencia, Castilla-La Mancha, Murcia, Castile and León offered additional incentives.

Sri Lanka
, 2,072 electric cars had been registered, led by the Nissan Leaf. EV sales experienced a record month in September 2015 with 471 units registered, up from only 15 in September 2014.

Sales of the Nissan Leaf began in 2013.

No government incentives promote EVs. Electric vehicle tax increased from 5% to 50% through the new government's Interim Budget.

Sweden

, a total of 355,737 light-duty plug-in electric vehicles have been registered since 2011, consisting of 226,731 plug-in hybrids, 120,343 all-electric cars and 8,663 all-electric utility vans.

The Swedish market is dominated by plug-in hybrids, representing 74.9% of plug-in car registrations through 2017, but began to decline thereafter, reaching 70.3% in 2020, and 57.5% in 2021. Passenger plug-ins increased their market share from 3.5% in 2016 to 5.2% in 2017, rose to 11.3% in 2019, to 32.2% in 2020, and achieved a record take rate of 45.0% in 2021.

, the Outlander PHEV continues to rank as the all-time top selling plug-in electric car with 9,957 units registered. , the Renault Kangoo Z.E. continued as the all-time the leader in the commercial utility EV segment with 1,024 units.

Effective January 2012 Sweden offered subsidies for the purchase and operation of 5,000 electric cars and other "super green cars" with low/no carbon emissions. The program was belatedly renewed through 2015 and again for 2016 with the addition of subsidies for electric buses.

Switzerland

, over 12,000 EVs had been registered since 2012.

Sales of new battery electric vehicles (BEV) rose from 3257 in 2015 to 5139 in 2018. At the first half of 2019, 5938 new BEV were sold, representing 3.8% of the overall sales.

Deliveries of the Mitsubishi i MiEV. the Nissan Leaf were launched in 2011.

The government offers no subsidies or incentives for purchasing EVs. Cantons can propose special discounts on annual taxes depending on the car's efficiency label and range from 100% rebate (e.g. Solothurn) to 0%.

Taiwan

Taiwan has a plan to ban all non-electric vehicles in the coming decades, due to concerns over air quality. The plan calls for all new government vehicles and public buses to be electric by 2030, ban sales of nonelectric motorcycles by 2035, and ban sales of nonelectric four-wheel vehicles by 2040.

In 2014 a local taxi association purchased over 1,500 BYD electric minivans.

Thailand

Turkey 

In 2019, 0.1% of cars sold in Turkey were hybrid or electric.

Ukraine

In November 2018 EV imports were almost 250% those of November 2017.

The Ukrainian Government passed a 2019 budget law which extended existing 2018 tax privileges for plug-in cars until 2023. Both new and second hand plug-in BEVs (without gasoline range extenders) may be imported free of VAT, import duty and excise duty. As a consequence of the law, new cars like for example the Tesla Model 3 can be purchased for a lower price than in any other country in Europe. This has stimulated demand in 2018 and the trend will most likely continue through 2019.

, a total of 19,884 plug-in cars and conventional hybrids are registered in Ukraine, consisting of 10,714 plug-ins and 9,170 hybrids. Over the year 2018, the number of electric vehicles increased by 73% (5,557 cars). The EV market share of total new and used cars first registered during 2018 was 2.8% based on 5,557 out of a total of 198,600 first registered cars.

7,542 vehicles were registered in this country over 2019. The market of commercial electric vehicles grew even more – by one and a half times. The most popular electric vehicle in Ukraine is Nissan Leaf. Last year, 3,217 vehicles of this particular model joined the car pool in this country. Tesla Model S comes second, with 623 car owners in Ukraine. Third place belongs to Volkswagen e-Golf, with 360 Ukrainians making their choice in its favor.

As of 1 August 2020, 46,000 green cars were registered in Ukraine. Of these, 23,000 were fully electric vehicles.

As of 1 June 2021, it is registered in Ukraine 64 459 green cars. 28 865 were fully electric vehicle and 35 594 hybrids. This is more than in all neighboring to Ukraine countries combined. It can be concluded that Ukraine is the leader of electric car mobility in the region of Eastern Europe.

As of June 2022, there are 36,602 fully electric cars registered in Ukraine

As of 1 October 2022 there were registered 42,289 fully electric cars in Ukraine.

United Kingdom

About 745,000 light-duty plug-in electric vehicles had been registered in the UK up until December 2021, consisting of 395,000 all-electric vehicles and 350,000 plug-in hybrids.

, the UK had 19,108 public charging points at 6,703 locations, of which 4,391 were rapid charging points at 1,332 locations.

A surge in plug-in car sales took place beginning in 2014. Total registrations went from 3,586 in 2013, to 37,092 in 2016, and rose to 59,911 in 2018. Sales climbed to 72,834 plug-in cars in 2019, and surged again in 2020 to 175,339 units, despite the global strong decline in car sales brought by the COVID-19 pandemic, and achieved record sales of 305,281 units in 2021.

The market share of the plug-in segment went from 0.16% in 2013 to 0.59% in 2014, and achieved 2.6% in 2018. The segment market share was 3.1% in 2019, rose to 10.7% in 2020, and achieved a record 18.6% in 2021.

, the Mitsubishi Outlander P-HEV is the all-time top selling plug-in car in the UK over 46,400 units registered, followed by the Nissan Leaf more than 31,400 units.

Government incentives

The government offered purchase incentives via the Plug-in Car Grant program beginning in 2011. The program was extended to include vans in February 2012 and in October 2016 to include large electric trucks. , a total of 176,962 eligible cars have benefited with the subsidy since the launch of the Plug-in Car Grant in 2011, and, the number of claims made through the Plug-in Van Grant scheme totaled 5,218 units since the launch of the programme in 2012. In April 2014 and December 2015, the government extended the program with modifications. Eligible ultra-low emission vehicles (ULEVs) included hydrogen fuel cell vehicles.

Separately, the government subsidized homeowners to install charge points at home via the "Electric Vehicle Homecharge Scheme". All-electric vehicles and eligible plug-in hybrids qualify for a 100% discount from the London congestion charge. A further phase from October 2021 will mean that only zero-emission vehicles (battery electric vehicle and hydrogen fuel cell vehicles) will qualify for the discount, which will be phased out completely from December 2025.

United States

, cumulative sales of highway legal plug-in electric cars in the U.S. totaled 2,322,291 units since 2010. California is the largest plug-in regional market in the country, with 1 million plug-in cars registered  by November 2021, 46% of the national stock. The other nine states that follow California Air Resources Board's Zero Emission Vehicle (ZEV) regulations accounted for another 10% of the American stock.

California is the largest plug-in regional market in the country, with plug-in car sales of 237,618 units in 2021, up from 132,742 in 2020 (+79.0%). The state's plug-in segment market share increased from 4.9% in 2017, to 8.1% in 2020, and reached 12.8% in 2021.

The American plug-in segment had a market share of 1.13% in 2017, up from 0.90% in 2016, then rose to 2.1% in 2018. A slightly declined to 1.9% occurred in 2019, rose to 2.2% in 2020, and achieved 4.0% in 2021.

Until 2018, the Chevrolet Volt plug-in hybrid was the all-time best selling plug-in electric car with 152,144 units of both generations. The Tesla Model 3 all-electric car surpassed in 2019 the discontinued Chevrolet Volt to become the all-time best selling plug-in car in U.S. history, with an estimated 300,471 units delivered since inception, followed by the Tesla Model S with about 157,992, and the Chevrolet Volt with 157,054. The Tesla Model S was the best selling plug-in car in the U.S. for three consecutive years, from 2015 to 2017, and the Model 3 topped sales also for three years running, from 2018 to 2020.

Most states have established additional incentives.

In addition, as of April 2021, three US states have introduced government mandates to ban the sale of gasoline powered cars in the future to push the transition to electric vehicles. Washington state's legislation would ban all sales and registrations of gasoline powered light vehicles made for or after their 2030 model year. California would ban the sale of all new fuel burning cars by 2035. Massachusetts would ban the sale of all new gasoline powered cars by 2035.

In December 2021, the Biden Administration imposed Executive Order 14057, which is a nationwide federal government mandate that will ban new fossil fuel vehicles from all 50 US States plus Washington D.C. and all US Territories by 2035 to push the transition to electric vehicles. The order will ban new car sales of fossil-fuel powered government-owned vehicles by 2027, new fossil-fuel buses by 2030, and new privately owned and commercial-owned vehicles by 2035. The order also calls for all government fleets to replace their fossil fuel vehicles with 100% all-electric vehicles by 2035, for all fossil fuel buses to be replaced by 100% all-electric buses by 2040, and for all privately owned and commercial-owned vehicles to be replaced by 100% all-electric vehicles by 2050.

Uruguay 

Plug-in electric vehicle sales in Uruguay started being reported in 2019, with 163 vehicles sold. Government incentives plus thermal fuel costs supports a strong annual growth rate, reaching 1044 BEV vehicles sales in 2022, about 1.8% of total vehicle sales.

The Uruguayan government through its Industry Ministry started offering in November 2022 a 5000USD subsidy (applied as a post-sale rebate) for the replacement of up to 100 thermal taxis and ride-hailing vehicles. As of 16 January 2023 there have been 28 subsidy requests. 

Regarding mass transit, as of 2021 there were 32 BEV buses in operation of a total of 5391 buses nationwide (including urban, suburban and regional buses). The main urban bus transport company in Montevideo (CUTCSA, with 1140 buses) adhered to COP26 emission targets, pledging to achieve a 25% of BEV fleet by 2025, reaching 100% by 2040.

Alongside the increasing sales there has been a strong expansion of the charging network: there were 150 charging stations at the end of 2022 (most of them slow charging), with a target of 300 fast-charging stations, or one every 50km, by the end of 2023.  The government is also creating incentives so private companies can install charging stations throughout the country, expanding the network.

Vietnam 

Plug-in electric vehicles in Vietnam maybe start with appearances by VinBus and VinFast VF e34 from Vingroup in 2021.

See also
 Phase-out of fossil fuel vehicles
 Government incentives for plug-in electric vehicles
 List of modern production plug-in electric vehicles
 Neighborhood Electric Vehicle
 List of renewable energy topics by country and territory
 List of countries by vehicles per capita

References

External links
 Akaki Mamaladze on production of first electric cars in Caucasus: "Our childhood dreams come true" – Interview of A.Mamaladze, director of AIProduction, for Caucasian Journal
 Driving Electrification – A Global Comparison of Fiscal Incentive Policy for Electric Vehicles, International Council on Clean Transportation, May 2014
 Global EV Data Explorer, International Energy Agency (IEA)
North America, China, Japan & Germany Electric Vehicle (EV) Charging Station Infrastructure Market, 2029
 Hybrid and Electric Vehicles – The Electric Drive Gains Traction (See section C, overview by country), IA-HEV, International Energy Agency, May 2013
 Modernizing vehicle regulations for electrification, International Council on Clean Transportation, October 2018.
 Plug-in Vehicles: A Case Study of Seven Markets (Norway, Netherlands, California, United States, France, Japan, and Germany), UC Davis, October 2014.
 Shades of Green – Electric Cars' Carbon Emissions Around the Globe, Shrink that Footprint, February 2013

Car